The fourteenth election to Glamorgan County Council, south Wales, took place in March 1931. It was preceded by the 1928 election and followed by the 1934 election.

Overview of the Result
Labour was defending a secure majority in an election where they faced opposition from the left in the form of the Communist Party, as well as more traditional opponents. The result showed little change from previous years.

Boundary Changes
There were no boundary changes at this election.

Candidates
13 candidates  were returned unopposed.

Contested Elections
Most of the retiring aldermen were returned.

Outcome
Labour retains their majority. The party won some additional seats, such as Pentre in the Rhondda where T.A. Thomas had held on against several previous Labour challenges.

In the Cymmer ward, David Thomas, who had failed to hold the seat in 1928 after David Watts-Morgan was elected alderman, was successful after the sitting Independent stood down.

Results

Aberaman

Aberavon

Abercynon

Aberdare Town

Bargoed
The sitting member had been elected as the official Labour candidate in 1928.

Barry

Barry Dock

Blaengwawr

Bridgend

Briton Ferry

Cadoxton

Caerphilly

Cilfynydd

Coedffranc

Cowbridge

Cwm Aber

Cwmavon

Cymmer

Dinas Powys

Dulais Valley

Ferndale

Gadlys

Glyncorrwg

Gower
W.H. Davies had won the seat in 1919, and was elected alderman. He failed to be re-elected in 1925 and 1928.

Hengoed

Hopkinstown

Kibbor

Llandaff

Llandeilo Talybont

Llanfabon

Llwydcoed

Llwynypia

Loughor

Maesteg, Caerau and Nantyffyllon

Maesteg, East and West

Mountain Ash

Neath (North)

Neath (South)

Newcastle

Ogmore Valley
The sitting Independent Labour councillor had recently died.

Penarth North

Penarth South

Pencoed
The sitting member, W.A. Howell, switched to contest the Porthcawl ward and Labour won the seat.

Penrhiwceiber

Pentre

Pontardawe

Pontyclun

Port Talbot East

Port Talbot West

Porthcawl

Pontlottyn

Pontycymmer

Pontypridd Town

Penygraig

Porth

Swansea Valley

Tonyrefail and Gilfach Goch

Trealaw

Treforest

Treherbert

Treorchy

Tylorstown

Vale of Neath

Ynyshir

Ystalyfera

Ystrad

Election of Aldermen
In addition to the 66 councillors the council consisted of 22 county aldermen. Aldermen were elected by the council, and served a six-year term. Following the 1931 election, there were eleven Aldermanic vacancies, and the retiring aldermen were all re-elected.

The following retiring aldermen were re-elected:
William Bowen (Lab, Llanfabon)
David Daniel Davies (Lab, Pontardawe)
Rose Davies (Lab, Aberaman)
John Evans (Lab, Maesteg)
Johnson Dicks (Lab, Abercynon)
E.H. Fleming (Lab, Hopkinstown)
William Jenkins (Lab, Glyncorrwg)
Caradoc Jones (Lab, Llandeilo Talybont)
David Lewis (Lab, Tylorstown)
John Thomas (Lab, Port Talbot)
Rev D.H. Williams (Ind, Barry)

By-elections
Eleven vacancies were caused by the election of aldermen.

Aberaman by-election

Abercynon by-election

Barry by-election

Glyncorrwg by-election

Hopkinstown by-election

Llandeilo Talybont by-election

Llanfabon by-election

Maesteg by-election

Pontardawe by-election

Port Talbot by-election

Tylorstown by-election

References

Bibliography

1931
1931 Welsh local elections
1930s in Glamorgan